Anna Henriette Levinsohn (née Andersen; 8 January 1839 – 22 March 1899) was a Danish operatic soprano/mezzo-soprano.

Levinsohn was born in Copenhagen on 8 January 1839. She made her debut at the Kongelige Theater in Copenhagen on 20 December 1860, as Hannette in Den Lille Rodlnttte, with a sympathetic impersonation. She became "royal actress" in 1866, and was, on her retirement in 1879, appointed court singer (Kongelig Kammersangerinde).

Her repertoire included: Rosina in Barberen, Susanna in Figaro's Bryllup, Papagena in Trylleflojten, Anna in Jaegerbruden, Benjamin in Joseph og Hans Brodre, Siebel in Faust, and Venus in Tannhauser.

She died in Copenhagen 22 March 1899.

References

Bibliography
Salmonsen's Store Illustrerede Konversations-Lexicon.

Attribution

1839 births
1899 deaths
Singers from Copenhagen
Jewish Danish musicians
Danish operatic sopranos
Danish operatic mezzo-sopranos
19th-century Danish women opera singers